Iowa's 4th congressional district is a congressional district in the U.S. state of Iowa that covers its northwestern part, bordering the states of Minnesota, South Dakota, and Nebraska, and the Missouri River. The district includes Sioux City, Ames, Mason City, Fort Dodge, Boone and Carroll; it is currently represented by Republican Randy Feenstra, who has been in office since 2021. With a Cook Partisan Voting Index rating of R+16, it is the most Republican district in Iowa.

History
Since the 1880s, there have been major changes in the location or nature of Iowa's 4th Congressional District. From 1886 until 1941, the district was made up of largely rural counties in northeastern Iowa, including the easternmost five counties in the northernmost two rows (and, during the 1930s, Buchanan and Delaware counties from the third row). During that era, the district included areas from Mason City east to the Mississippi River.

In 1941, Iowa's 5th Congressional District (made up of rural counties in southern Iowa) was renumbered as Iowa's 4th Congressional District, and counties in the old 4th District were placed in the 3rd District and the 2nd District. (In 1942, 4th District incumbent, Henry O. Talle, would defeat the 2nd District incumbent William S. Jacobsen in the new 2nd Congressional District). From 1941 until 1960 the 4th Congressional District included the central five counties of each of the two southernmost tiers, plus four counties between Des Moines and Iowa City (Mahaska, Keokuk, Jasper and Poweshiek). 5th District incumbent Republican U.S. Representative Karl M. LeCompte was reelected in the reconfigured 4th District in 1942, and was reelected in the next seven races. In 1958, when LeCompte did not run for reelection, Democrat Steven V. Carter defeated Republican John Kyl. A recurrence of cancer would claim Carter's life before the end of his only term, and Kyl won the special election and next general election. In 1961 the 4th Congressional District was expanded to include five central Iowa counties - Warren, Marion, Marshall, Tama and Benton - but retained its rural character. Kyl held this seat until he was swept out in the massive Democratic landslide of 1964.  However, he regained his old seat in 1966, and was reelected two more times.

The rural character of the district was changed when most of its territory was merged with the Des Moines-based 5th District of Democratic incumbent Neal Smith after the 1970 census.  Polk County (home to Des Moines and most of its suburbs) was added, while most of the rural counties were taken out.  Smith defeated Kyl in the 1972 congressional election. The district became even less rural in 1981, when Story County (home of Ames) was added, and other rural counties were taken out. The district was significantly altered after the 1990 census, when it was reconfigured to take in the southwest quadrant of the state from Des Moines to Council Bluffs.  Smith was reelected in 1992, but defeated in 1994 by Republican Greg Ganske.

The 2001 remap made the 4th district a north-central Iowa district.  It could not be said to be the successor of any of the previous districts. It was a primarily rural district, though it included Ames and Mason City.  It did not include any of the state's nine largest cities, and only four of the twenty largest Iowa cities.  The plan went into effect in 2003 for the 108th U.S. Congress. The 5th's incumbent congressman, Tom Latham, had his home in Alexander drawn into the 4th, and was elected from this district five times.

For the 2012 elections, the Iowa Legislature passed a plan that went into effect in 2013 for the 113th U.S. Congress. The district now covers the northwest corner of the state, and essentially merged the northern half of the old 5th District with the western third of the old 4th. The new map placed Latham and 5th District incumbent Steve King in the same district. Although the new 4th was geographically more Latham's district, he opted to move to the redrawn 3rd District, leaving King to take the seat. The current 4th district is by far the most conservative in Iowa - it was the only one of the state's four districts to be won by Mitt Romney in 2012, and Donald Trump carried it by over 25 points in 2016. Additionally, King was the only Republican House member from Iowa during the 116th Congress, although he faced a close race in 2018 due to his long history of controversial comments.

In June 2020, Steve King was defeated in the Republican House primary by challenger Randy Feenstra.

Statewide races since 2000
Election results from statewide races:

List of members representing the district

Historical election results

Recent election results

2002

Note: Jim Hennager ran on the Earth Federation Party platform on the ballot.

2004

2006

2008

2010

2012

2014

2016

2018

2020

Historical district boundaries

See also

Iowa's congressional districts
List of United States congressional districts
Redistricting in the United States

References
General

Specific
 
 
 Congressional Biographical Directory of the United States 1774–present

04